Daniel Luke Polson, OAM (born 6 January 1974) in Adelaide, South Australia is an Australian Paralympic cyclist.  He won a gold medal at the 2000 Sydney Games in the Mixed Bicycle Road Race LC2 event, for which he received a Medal of the Order of Australia.

References

Paralympic cyclists of Australia
Cyclists at the 2000 Summer Paralympics
Paralympic gold medalists for Australia
Recipients of the Medal of the Order of Australia
Living people
Medalists at the 2000 Summer Paralympics
1974 births
Australian male cyclists
Paralympic medalists in cycling